Jessica James may refer to:

Jessie James (born 1988), American country pop singer and songwriter
One of the victims of the 1997 Heath High School shooting
Jessica James and the Outlaws, 1960s American girl vocal trio
Jessica James (author), American fiction writer 
Jessica James, main character of the film The Incredible Jessica James
Jessica Jaymes (1979–2019) Former actress and porn star

See also
Jesse James (disambiguation)